Ali Reza Pahlavi (1 March 1922 – 17 October 1954) was the second son of Reza Shah Pahlavi, Shah of Iran, and the brother of Mohammad Reza Pahlavi. He was a member of the Pahlavi dynasty.

Biography 
Ali Reza Pahlavi studied political science at Harvard University. Following Reza Shah's deposition and exile, Ali Reza accompanied his father in exile in Mauritius and then into Johannesburg, South Africa.

He was married to Christiane Cholewska; they had a son, Patrick Ali Pahlavi (born 1 September 1947). However, there is no record of his parents' 20 November 1946 wedding in the 16th arrondissement of Paris. The couple divorced in 1948. Christiane had a son from a previous marriage, Joachim Christian Philippe, born 15 September 1941.

Ali Reza died on 17 October 1954 in a plane crash in the Alborz Mountains.

Honours

National honours 
  Knight Grand Cordon of the Order of Pahlavi
  Order of Military Merit, First Class (1937)
  Order of Military Merit, Second Class (1937)
  Order of Glory, First Class (1937)

Foreign honours 
  Knight Grand Cordon of the Supreme Order of the Renaissance (28 February 1949)
  Member First Class of the Order of the Supreme Sun

References

External links

Ali Reza
1922 births
1954 deaths
Iranian royalty
Victims of aviation accidents or incidents in Iran
Harvard University alumni
People from Tehran
Mazandarani people
People exiled to Mauritius